"Precious Blood" is the debut single by American punk rock band The Gits, and their first official release. The record was released as a limited edition 7" single of only 800 copies by the local Seattle label Big Flaming Ego Records. Included in the track listing were early versions of "Precious Blood" and "Seaweed" (later re-recorded for the Enter: The Conquering Chicken album) as well as "Kings & Queens" (later included on the Frenching the Bully album).

Track listing
 "Precious Blood"
 "Seaweed"
 "Kings & Queens"

References

The Gits songs
1990 singles
1990 songs